The 2013 Star World Championships were held in San Diego, United States between August 28 and September 8, 2013.

Results

External links
Official website
Results
 

Star World Championships
Star World Championships
Star World Championships in the United States
Star World